Julien Gustave Gaillardin, known as Julien Gustave Gagliardini (1 March 1846, Mulhouse - 28 November 1927, Paris) was a French Impressionist landscape painter and engraver.

Biography 
His family was originally from Italy. He began as a student of the history painter, then worked in the studios of Léon Cogniet at the École des Beaux-Arts in Paris. His first exhibit at the Salon came in 1869, with a series of genre scenes and portraits.

By the 1880s, he had abandoned those subjects and was devoting himself entirely to landscapes. He quickly developed a preference for Auvergne and the south of France; areas that would remain his favorites for the rest of his life. While working there, he became a close friend of François Nardi, another French artist of Italian ancestry, who encouraged him to use the original form of his family name.

He benefitted from several major government purchases, in 1880, 1891 and 1913. After being awarded several second and third class medals, he was the recipient of a silver medal at the Exposition Universelle (1889) and a gold medal at the Exposition Universelle (1900). He was named a Knight in the Legion of Honor in 1893.

References

Further reading 
 Hélène Braeuener, "Gagliardini", in Les Peintres de la baie de Somme : autour de l'impressionnisme, La Renaissance du livre, Tournai, 2001, pp. 60–61 
 Raymond Oberlé, "Julien Gustave Gagliardini (pseud. de Gaillardin)", in Nouveau Dictionnaire de Biographie Alsacienne, vol. 12, p. 1096

External links 

More works by Gagliardini @ ArtNet

1846 births
1927 deaths
19th-century French painters
French landscape painters
Recipients of the Legion of Honour
French Impressionist painters
Artists from Mulhouse
20th-century French painters